WD 1856+534 is a white dwarf located in the constellation of Draco. The white dwarf displays a featureless absorption spectrum, lacking strong optical absorption or emission features in its atmosphere. WD 1856+534 is approximately half as massive as the Sun, while its radius is much smaller, being 40% larger than Earth.

Planetary system 
The white dwarf is known to host one exoplanet, WD 1856b, in orbit around it. The exoplanet was detected through the transit method by the Transiting Exoplanet Survey Satellite (TESS) between July and August 2019. An analysis of the transit data in 2020 revealed that it is a Jupiter-like giant planet with a radius over ten times that of Earth's, and orbits its host star closely at a distance of 0.02 astronomical units (AU), with an orbital period 60 times shorter than that of Mercury around the Sun. The unexpectedly close distance of the exoplanet to the white dwarf implies that it must have migrated inward after its host star evolved from a red giant to a white dwarf, otherwise it would have been engulfed by its star. This migration may be related to the fact that WD 1856+534 belongs to a hierarchical triple-star system: the white dwarf and its planet are gravitationally bound to a distant companion, G 229-20, which itself is a binary system of two red dwarf stars. Gravitational interactions with the companion stars may have triggered the planet's migration through the Lidov–Kozai mechanism in a manner similar to some hot Jupiters. An alternative hypothesis is that the planet instead has survived a common envelope phase. In the latter scenario, other planets engulfed before may have contributed to the expulsion of the stellar envelope.

The planetary transmission spectrum is gray and featureless, likely because of the high level of hazes.

See also 
 WD 1145+017, a white dwarf with a transiting disrupted planetary-mass object
 WD J0914+1914, a white dwarf with a disk of debris originating from a possible giant planet
 ZTF J0139+5245, another white dwarf with a disk of debris from a disrupted planetary-mass object

References

External links 
 NASA Missions Spy First Possible ‘Survivor’ Planet Hugging White Dwarf Star, Sean Potter, NASA, 16 September 2020
 Planet discovered transiting a dead star, Steven Parsons, Nature News and Views, 16 September 2020

White dwarfs
Astronomical objects discovered in 2020
Draco (constellation)
Planetary systems with one confirmed planet
Gas giants
1690, TOI